Bryant Cameron Webb (born June 21, 1983) is an American physician, attorney, and political candidate from Virginia. He currently serves as the White House Senior Policy Advisor for COVID-19 Equity in the Biden administration.

Early life and education
Webb is a native of Spotsylvania, Virginia. He earned a Bachelor of Arts in interdisciplinary studies from the University of Virginia, a Doctor of Medicine from the Wake Forest School of Medicine, and a Juris Doctor from Loyola University Chicago School of Law.

Career 
Webb was a White House Fellow in 2016 and 2017. He works at the University of Virginia Health System as an Assistant Professor of Medicine and Public Health Science.

In the Democratic primary on June 23, Webb defeated three candidates to win the nomination. He was defeated by Republican nominee Bob Good in the November general election.

On January 16, 2021, it was announced that Webb would serve as a COVID-19 Senior Policy Advisor in the incoming Biden Administration.

Personal life
Webb is married and has two children.

References

External links

Living people
People from Spotsylvania County, Virginia
University of Virginia alumni
Wake Forest School of Medicine alumni
Loyola University Chicago School of Law alumni
Virginia Democrats
21st-century American politicians
Biden administration personnel
1983 births